The 11th Hour is a 2007 documentary film on the state of the natural environment created, produced, co-written and narrated by Leonardo DiCaprio. It was directed by Leila Conners Petersen and Nadia Conners and financed by Adam Lewis and Pierre André Senizergues, and distributed by Warner Independent Pictures.

Its world premiere was at the 2007 60th Annual Cannes Film Festival (May 16–27, 2007) and it was released on August 17, 2007, in the year in which the Fourth Assessment Report of the United Nations global warming panel IPCC was published and about a year after Al Gore's An Inconvenient Truth, another film documentary about global warming.

Synopsis
With contributions from over 50 politicians, scientists, and environmental activists, including former Soviet leader Mikhail Gorbachev, physicist Stephen Hawking, Nobel Prize winner Wangari Maathai, journalist Armand Betscher, and Paul Hawken, the film documents the grave problems facing the planet's life systems. Global warming, deforestation, mass species extinction, and depletion of the oceans' habitats are all addressed. The film's premise is that the future of humanity is in jeopardy.

The film proposes potential solutions to these problems by calling for restorative action by the reshaping and rethinking of global human activity through technology, social responsibility and conservation.

Quotes

People interviewed

Kenny Ausubel
Thom Hartmann
Wangari Maathai
Sandra Postel
Paul Stamets
David W. Orr
Stephen Hawking
Oren Lyons
Andrew C. Revkin
Sylvia Earle
Paul Hawken
Janine Benyus
Stuart Pimm
Paolo Soleri
David Suzuki
James Hillman
James Parks Morton
Nathan Gardels
Wes Jackson
Joseph Tainter
Richard Heinberg
James Woolsey
Vijay Vaitheeswaran
Brock Dolman
Stephen Schneider
Bill McKibben
Peter de Menocal
Sheila Watt-Cloutier
Ray Anderson
Tim Carmichael
Omar Freilla
Wallace J. Nichols
Diane Wilson
Andrew Weil
Theo Colborn
Jeremy Jackson
Tzeporah Berman
Gloria Flora
Mikhail Gorbachev
Thomas Linzey
Michel Gelobter
Lester Brown
Herman Daly
Betsy Taylor
Wade Davis
Jerry Mander
William McDonough
Bruce Mau
John Todd
Rick Fedrizzi
Greg Watson
Leo Gerard
Mathew Petersen
Peter Warshall
Andy Lipkis

Environmental views
Experts interviewed underlined that everyone must become involved to reverse the destruction and climate change. The role of humans in the destruction of the environment is explained from the viewpoint of several different professional fields including environmental scientists, oceanographers, economic historians, and medical specialists. The many experts called upon in this documentary demonstrate a consensus concerning human-caused climate change, and the many other impacts of industrialization such as the dramatic loss of species (biodiversity).

Critical response
In March 2008 The 11th Hour was awarded the Earthwatch Environmental Film Award at National Geographic in Washington, DC.

The film received generally favorable reviews from critics, with a 67% "Fresh" rating on Rotten Tomatoes based on 94 reviews, with an average rating of 6.5/10. The site's critics consensus reads, "Well-researched and swimming in scientific data, this global warming documentary offers some practical and wide-ranging solutions to our climate crisis."
It has an average score of 63% on Metacritic based on 30 reviews, indicating "generally favorable reviews".

Kevin Crust, a critic from the Los Angeles Times, rated the film highly:

See also
Ecological footprint
Global catastrophic risks

References

External links
  (Moved to Warner Bros. : MOVIES 11th Hour)
 Official Eleventh Hour Action site
 
 Leo Warms to Global-Warming Film (E! Online Article)
 Vanity Fair Article
 EarthLab.com

2007 in the environment
2007 films
American documentary films
Documentary films about environmental issues
2007 documentary films
Films produced by Leonardo DiCaprio
Documentary films about global warming
2000s English-language films
2000s American films